Pulicaria vieraeoides is a species of flowering plant in the family Asteraceae. It is found only in Yemen. Its natural habitat is subtropical or tropical dry shrubland.

References

vieraeoides
Endemic flora of Socotra
Vulnerable plants
Taxonomy articles created by Polbot
Taxa named by Isaac Bayley Balfour